Geraldine Gail Turner  (born 23 June 1950 in Brisbane, Australia) is an Australian actress and singer. She has been a leading performer in Australian musical theatre since the 1970s, and has also been active in plays, recordings, film and television.

Early life
Turner was born and raised in Brisbane. Her career in performance began at an early age. As a child, Turner appeared in productions of Aladdin and The Sleeping Princess and as a performer on the local television variety program Cottee's Happy Hour. She trained in classical ballet and classical singing.

Theatre
In the early 1970s, Turner appeared with the Queensland Theatre Company in the musicals Lock Up Your Daughters, A Rum Do!, Oh, What a Lovely War! and the play She Stoops to Conquer.

She played Petra in the 1973 original Australian cast of A Little Night Music (J. C. Williamson's) and the lead role of Desiree Armfeldt in a 1990 Sydney Theatre Company revival. Other roles in Stephen Sondheim musicals include Mrs Lovett in Sweeney Todd (Melbourne Theatre Company), The Baker's Wife in Into the Woods and Joanne in Company (Sydney Theatre Company).

Other notable musical theatre roles include Nancy in Oliver!, Velma Kelly in the original Australian cast of Chicago (Sydney Theatre Company), Reno Sweeney in Anything Goes and Katisha in The Mikado (Essgee). She has performed in Australian musicals Summer Rain (Queensland Theatre Company), Jonah Jones (Sydney Theatre Company) and Ned Kelly (Adelaide Festival Centre Trust/Australian Elizabethan Theatre Trust). Turner has also featured in various plays including Inheritance (Melbourne Theatre Company), Present Laughter and Don's Party (Sydney Theatre Company). In cabaret, she has performed in Australia, the United States, the United Kingdom, Canada and Africa.

Recordings
Turner features in Australian cast recordings of Chicago and Anything Goes. She has several solo albums including two compilations of Sondheim songs, Old Friends (also released as The Stephen Sondheim Songbook) and Geraldine Turner Sings the Stephen Sondheim Songbook Volume 2.

Film and television
Her films roles include Vere in Careful, He Might Hear You (which won the AFI Award for Best Film in 1983), The Wog Boy and Summerfield. Turner has played a recurring role in the Australian television drama House Husbands.

Filmography 

FILM

TELEVISION

Personal life
She was married briefly at age 21.

Her second husband is conductor Brian Castles-Onion.

She was the federal President of Actors Equity (MEAA) in Australia. She stood in the 2008 local government election for the Wingecarribee Shire Council in the Southern Highlands of New South Wales, and has advocated for the role of the arts in the community.

Turner published an autobiography in 2022, Turner's Turn.

Awards
 1984 Green Room Award for Female Actor in a Leading Role (Music Theatre) – Oliver!
 1989 Green Room Award for Female Actor in a Leading Role (Music Theatre) – Anything Goes
 1988 Order of Australia medal for services to the performing arts

Mo Awards
The Australian Entertainment Mo Awards (commonly known informally as the Mo Awards), were annual Australian entertainment industry awards. They recognise achievements in live entertainment in Australia from 1975 to 2016. Turner won one award in that time.
 (wins only)
|-
| 1988
| Geraldine Turner
| Female Musical Theatre Performer of the Year
| 
|-

References

1950 births
Living people
Actresses from Brisbane
Musicians from Brisbane
Australian musical theatre actresses
Australian film actresses
Australian television actresses
Recipients of the Medal of the Order of Australia
People educated at St Margaret's Anglican Girls' School